James Kirke Paulding (August 22, 1778 – April 6, 1860) was an American writer and, for a time, the United States Secretary of the Navy. Paulding's early writings were satirical and violently anti-British, as shown in The Diverting History of John Bull and Brother Jonathan (1812). He wrote numerous long poems and serious histories. Among his novels are Konigsmarke, the Long Finne (1823) and The Dutchman's Fireside (1831). He is best known for creating the inimitable Nimrod Wildfire, the “half horse, half alligator” in The Lion of the West (1831), and as collaborator with William Irving and Washington Irving in Salmagundi. (1807–08). Paulding was also, by the mid-1830s, an ardent and outspoken defender of slavery, and he later endorsed southern secession from the union.

Biography
James Kirke Paulding was born on August 22, 1778, at Pleasant Valley, Dutchess County, New York. His parents were William Paulding and Catherine Ogden. Paulding was chiefly self-educated.

He became a close friend of Washington Irving. With Irving, Paulding proposed a literary project. As he described, "one day in a frolicsome mood, we broached the idea of a little periodical merely for our own amusement, and that of the town, for neither of us anticipated any further circulation." The result was Salmagundi; a short-lived satirical periodical, from which the word 'Gotham' was first ascribed as a name for New York City.

Along with Irving, Paulding was associated with the "Knickerbocker Group", a group which also included William Cullen Bryant, Gulian Crommelin Verplanck, Fitz-Greene Halleck, Joseph Rodman Drake, Robert Charles Sands, Lydia Maria Child, and Nathaniel Parker Willis.

Paulding's other writings also include The Diverting History of John Bull and Brother Jonathan (1812), a satire, The Dutchman's Fireside (1831), a romance which attained popularity, A Life of Washington (1835), and some poems. Extracts from his epic poem The Backwoodsman (1818) were popularly reprinted throughout his life. In the decade before Washington Irving and James Fenimore Cooper achieved popular success, Paulding experimented in every genre in an effort to forge a new American literature. Thereafter, his outstanding contributions were in the novel and in a stage comedy. Koningsmarke (1823), which he began as a spoof of Walter Scott's historical romances, took unexpected hold of his imagination and became a well-turned novel, notable for its portrait of an old black woman that anticipates William Faulkner and for its sympathetic yet unromanticized depiction of the Indian. The Lion of the West (1831), selected in a play competition in which William Cullen Bryant was one of the judges, presented a cartoon of Davy Crockett; it was the most-often performed play on the American stage before Uncle Tom's Cabin, and an altered version enjoyed success in London. Paulding's View of Slavery in the United States (1836) was a comprehensive defense of both Black slavery and America's claim to be a bastion of liberty against the attacks of abolitionists and European critics.

Among Paulding's government positions were those of secretary to the Board of Navy Commissioners in 1815–23 and Naval Agent in New York in 1824–38. President Martin Van Buren appointed him Secretary of the Navy in June 1838. As Secretary, he was a conservative figure, whose extensive knowledge of naval affairs was balanced by notable lack of enthusiasm for new technology. He opposed the introduction of steam-propelled warships declaring that he would "never consent to let our old ships perish, and transform our Navy into a fleet of (steam) sea monsters." Nevertheless, his tenure was marked by advances in steam engineering, wide-ranging exploration efforts, enlargement of the fleet and an expansion of the Navy's apprenticeship program.

In 1839, Paulding was elected as a member to the American Philosophical Society.

Paulding left office with the change of administrations in March 1841, returned to literary pursuits and took up agriculture. He died at his farm near Hyde Park, New York. He is interred at Green-Wood Cemetery in Brooklyn, New York.

USS James K. Paulding (DD-238) was named in honor of Secretary of the Navy Paulding.

Personal life 
Paulding married Gertrude Kemble (d. 1841) on 15 November 1818. Gertrude was the daughter of New York merchant Peter Kemble and the sister of U.S. congressman Gouverneur Kemble. They had four sons:

 Peter Kemble Paulding (1819-1900)
 William Irving Paulding (1825-1890)
 Gouverneur Paulding (1829-1913)
 James Nathaniel Paulding (1833-1898)

Oft-quoted phrase 
Paulding's story, "The Politician" contains a maxim that is often attributed to Samuel Gompers: "Reward your friends and punish your enemies." The story appears in his collection, Tales of the Good Woman, by a Doubtful Gentleman.  The same basic idea (a definition of justice as doing good to friends and harm to enemies), appears in Plato's dialogue, the Republic, where it is subsequently rejected as inadequate.

Important works 
 1807–1808 – Salmagundi (with Washington Irving)
 1812 – The Diverting History of John Bull and Brother Jonathan
 1813 – The Lay of the Scottish Fiddle
 1818 – The Backwoodsman
 1820 – Salmagundi. Second Series 
 1822 – A Sketch of Old England by a New England Man
 1823 – Koningsmarke, the Long Finne
 1825 – John Bull in America, or the New Munchausen
 1826 – The Merry Tales of the Three Wise Men of Gotham
 1828 – The New Mirror for Travellers
 1829 – Tales of the Good Woman, by a Doubtful Gentleman
 1830 – Chronicles of the City of Gotham
 1831 – The Dutchman's Fireside
 1832 – Westward Ho!
 1835 – Life of George Washington, in two volumes
 1836 – View of Slavery in the United States
 1836 – The Book of St. Nicholas
 1838 – A Gift from Fairy Land
 1846 – The Old Continental, or the Price of Liberty
 1849 – The Puritan and his Daughter

Legacy and honors
The World War II Liberty Ship  was named in his honor.

References

Further reading
 Aderman, Ralph M., and Wayne R. Kime. Advocate for America: The Life of James Kirke Paulding (Susquehanna University Press, 2003).
 Aderman, Ralph M. "James Kirke Paulding on Literature and the West." American Literature (1955) 27#1: 97–101. online
 Person Jr, Leland S. "James Kirke Paulding: Myth and the Middle Ground." Western American Literature 16.1 (1981): 39–54. online
 Watkins, Floyd C. "James Kirke Paulding and the South." American Quarterly 5.3 (1953): 219–230. online

External links
 "The Knickerbocker's Rescue Santa Claus" – an excerpt from Kirke Paulding's "The Book of Saint Nicholas" (1836)

1778 births
1860 deaths
Novelists from New York (state)
United States Secretaries of the Navy
Burials at Green-Wood Cemetery
Van Buren administration cabinet members
19th-century American politicians
People from Hyde Park, New York
American male novelists
American male poets
19th-century American novelists
19th-century American dramatists and playwrights
19th-century American poets
New York (state) Democratic-Republicans
American male dramatists and playwrights
Knickerbocker Group
American essayists